The March of Genoa or Eastern Liguria was created in 961 by the Emperor Otto I. It was originally called either the marca Obertenga after its first holder, Oberto I, or the marca Januensis after its original capital and chief city, Genoa. Its creation was part of a general reorganisation of the northwest of Italy into three frontier districts. Western Liguria became the March of Montferrat and the interior became the March of Turin. It comprised the counties of Luni, Tortona, Milan, and Genoa. 

The march was originally held in the elder line of the Obertenghi, descended from Oberto I. The title marchio became common in the family. Albert Azzo II was called marchio de L(a/o)ngobardia. By his time, the march was often called the March of Milan or Liguria. His grandson, Obizzo I, became the first Margrave of Este in 1173 and was created "Margrave of Milan and Genoa" in 1184 by the Emperor Frederick I. From thereafter, the title of Este had more importance, especially with the growth of the commune of Milan and the Republic of Genoa.

Margraves
Oberto I, 961–c.997
Adalbert, c.997
Oberto II, c.997–c.1013
Albert Azzo I, c.1013–c.1029
Albert Azzo II, c.1029–1097
Fulk I, 1097–c.1146
Obizzo I, c.1146–1193

Further reading
Balzaretti, Ross. Dark Age Liguria: Regional Identity and Local Power, c. 400–1020. London: Bloomsbury, 2013.
Formentini, Ubaldo. "Nuove ricerche intorno alla marca della Liguria orientale". Giornale storico e letterario della Liguria, Ser. NS, vol. 1 (1925) pp. 12–23, 69–89 and 220–30.
Formentini, Ubaldo. Marca Ianuensis: Nuove ricerche intorno alla marca della Liguria orientale. Pontremoli, 1926.
Ricci, Roberto. La marca della Liguria orientale e gli Obertenghi, 945–1056: una storia complessa e una storiografia problematica. Spoleto: Fondazione Centro italiano di studi sull'alto Medioevo, 2007.

Genoa, March of
Genoa, March of
States and territories established in the 960s
History of Liguria
961 establishments